Two Fists, One Heart is a 2008 Australian drama film directed by Shawn Seet and written by Rai Fazio, and is based on Fazio's own life growing up. The film is set and was shot in Perth, Western Australia. The film follows Anthony Argo, an Italian Australian boxer whose Sicilian father/trainer wants Anthony to pursue boxing but he forsakes it 
when he meets Kate and perceives differently than his father the violence in the sport. She is a girl from the other side of the tracks. But Anthony reconsiders when his father's boxing student quits; Anthony begins to train much more than before in preparation for the biggest fight of his life.

Cast
 Daniel Amalm as Anthony Argo
 Ennio Fantastichini as Anthony's father Joe Argo
 Jessica Marais as Kate
 Rai Fazio as Nico
 Tim Minchin as Kate's brother Tom
 Paul Pantano as Theo
 Nicole Trunfio as Jessica
 Sam Greco as Mick
 Manfred Yon as Kate's ex Rudy

Reception
Cinema Autopsy awarded the film 2.5 stars. The film was heavily criticized in the article I'm Here to Save Screen Australia Time and Money, and Screen Australia's CEO Ruth Harley expressed disappointment in the article "Screen Aus reviews Two Fists Failure".

Budget and Box Office
Two Fists, One Heart cost $8,500,000 (which included a $4 million investment from Screen Australia) and made $305,300.

See also
Cinema of Australia

References

External links
 

2008 films
2000s sports drama films
Australian boxing films
Australian sports drama films
Films set in Australia
Films directed by Shawn Seet
2008 drama films
2000s Australian films